The Eyre Creek is a river in the Southland region of New Zealand's South Island.  It is a tributary of the Mataura River with a braided channel and with its confluence near the small town of Athol.  It rises on the eastern side of Jane Peak in the Eyre Mountains south-west of Lake Wakatipu.  It has been identified as an Important Bird Area by BirdLife International because it supports breeding colonies of the endangered black-billed gull.

References

Rivers of Southland, New Zealand
Important Bird Areas of New Zealand
Rivers of New Zealand